Lord of the Dead is a collection of crime short stories by Robert E. Howard.  It was first published in 1981 by Donald M. Grant, Publisher, Inc. in an edition of 1,250 copies.  The stories are pastiches of Sax Rohmer.

Contents
 "Introduction—From Limehouse to River Street", by Robert E. Briney
 "The Lord of the Dead"
 "Names in the Black Book"
 "The Mystery of Tannernoe Lodge", with Fred Blosser

References

1981 short story collections
Short story collections by Robert E. Howard
Donald M. Grant, Publisher books